Newnham College is a women's constituent college of the University of Cambridge.

The college was founded in 1871 by a group organising Lectures for Ladies, members of which included philosopher Henry Sidgwick and suffragist campaigner Millicent Garrett Fawcett. It was the second women's college to be founded at Cambridge, following Girton College. The College celebrated its 150th anniversary throughout 2021 and 2022.

History
The history of Newnham begins with the formation of the Association for Promoting the Higher Education of Women in Cambridge in 1869. The progress of women at Cambridge University owes much to the pioneering work undertaken by the philosopher Henry Sidgwick, fellow of Trinity. Lectures for Ladies had been started in Cambridge in 1869, and such was the demand from those who could not travel in and out on a daily basis that in 1871 Sidgwick, one of the organisers of the lectures, rented a house at 74, Regent Street  to house five female students who wished to attend lectures but did not live near enough to the University to do so. He persuaded Anne Clough, who had previously run a school in the Lake District, to take charge of this house.  The following year (1872), Clough moved to Merton House (built c. 1800) on Queen's Road, then to premises in Bateman Street. Clough eventually became president of the college.

Demand continued to increase and the supporters of the enterprise formed a limited company to raise funds, lease land and build on it. in 1875 the first building for Newnham College was built on the site off Sidgwick Avenue where the college remains. In 1876 Henry Sidgwick married Eleanor Mildred Balfour who was already a supporter of women's education. They lived at Newnham for two periods during the 1880s and 1890s.

The college formally came into existence in 1880 with the amalgamation of the Association and the Company. Women were allowed to sit University examinations as of right from 1881; their results were recorded in separate class-lists. Its name  has occasionally been spelt phonetically  as Newham College.

The demand from prospective students remained buoyant and the Newnham Hall Company built steadily, providing three more halls, a laboratory and a library, in the years up to the First World War. The architect Basil Champneys was employed throughout this period and designed the buildings in the Queen Anne style to much acclaim, giving the main college buildings an extraordinary unity. These and later buildings are grouped around beautiful gardens, which many visitors to Cambridge never discover, and, unlike most Cambridge colleges, students may walk on the grass for most of the year.

Many young women in mid-19th-century England had no access to the kind of formal secondary schooling which would have enabled them to go straight into the same university courses as the young men – the first principal herself had never been a pupil in a school. So Newnham's founders allowed the young women to work at and to a level which suited their attainments and abilities. Some of them, with an extra year's preparation, did indeed go on to degree-level work. And as girls' secondary schools were founded in the last quarter of the 19th century, staffed often by those who had been to the women's colleges of Cambridge, Oxford and London, the situation began to change. In 1890 the Newnham student Philippa Fawcett was ranked above the Senior Wrangler, i.e. top in the Mathematical Tripos. By the First World War the vast majority of Newnham students were going straight into degree-level courses.

In tailoring the curriculum to the students, Newnham found itself at odds with the other Cambridge college for women, Girton, founded two years earlier. Emily Davies, Girton's founder, believed passionately that equality could only be expressed by women doing the same courses as the men, on the same time-table. This meant that Girton attracted a much smaller intake in its early years. But the Newnham Council held its ground, reinforced by the commitment of many of its members to educational reform generally and a wish to change some of the courses Cambridge was offering to its men.

In 1948 Newnham, like Girton, attained the full status of a college of the university.

Women in the university

The university as an institution at first took no notice of these women and arrangements to sit examinations had to be negotiated with each examiner individually. In 1868 Cambridge's Local Examinations Board (governing non-university examinations) allowed women to take exams for the first time. Concrete change within the university would have to wait until the first female colleges were formed, and following the foundation of Girton College (1869) and Newnham (1871) women were allowed into lectures, albeit at the discretion of the lecturer. By 1881, however, a general permission to sit examinations was negotiated.

A first attempt to secure for the women the titles and privileges of their degrees, not just a certificate from their colleges, was rebuffed in 1887 and a second try in 1897 went down to even more spectacular defeat. Undergraduates demonstrating against the women and their supporters did hundreds of pounds' worth of damage in the Market Square.

The First World War brought a catastrophic collapse of fee income for the men's colleges and Cambridge and Oxford both sought state financial help for the first time. This was the context in which the women tried once more to secure inclusion, this time asking not only for the titles of degrees but also for the privileges and involvement in university government that possession of degrees proper would bring. In Oxford this was secured in 1920 but in Cambridge the women went down to defeat again in 1921, having to settle for the titles – the much-joked-about BA tit – but not the substance of degrees. This time the male undergraduates celebrating victory over the women used a handcart as a battering ram to destroy the lower half of the bronze gates at Newnham, a memorial to Anne Clough.

The women spent the inter-war years trapped on the threshold of the university. They could hold university posts but they could not speak or vote in the affairs of their own departments or of the university as a whole. Finally, in 1948 the women were admitted to full membership of the university, although the university still retained powers to limit their numbers.
National university expansion after the Second World War brought further change. In 1954, a third women's college, New Hall, (now Murray Edwards College), was founded. In 1965 the first mixed graduate college, Darwin College, was founded. The 1970s saw three men's colleges (Churchill, Clare and King's) admit women for the first time. Gradually Cambridge was ceasing to be "a men's university although of a mixed type", as it had been described in the 1920s in a memorably confused phrase. Cambridge now has no all-male colleges and Girton is also mixed. Newnham and Murray Edwards  retain all-female student bodies, whilst Lucy Cavendish College started admitting men in 2021.

With the conversion of the last men-only colleges into mixed colleges in the 1970s and '80s, there were inevitably questions about whether any of the remaining women-only colleges would also change to mixed colleges. The issue again became prominent as women-only colleges throughout the rest of the country began admitting men, and following the 2007 announcement that Oxford University's last remaining women-only college, St Hilda's, would admit men, Cambridge is the only university in the United Kingdom where colleges have admissions policies that discriminate on the basis of gender.

College arms
Argent, on a chevron azure between in chief two crosses botonny fitchy and in base a mullet sable, a griffin's head erased or between two mascles of the field.

These arms, granted in 1923, were designed by the Revd Edward Earle Dorling to incorporate charges from the arms of those intimately connected with the founding of the college.

In the early years of the college Anne Clough was the Principal. She came of the family of Clough of Plas Clough, Denbighshire, which bore: Azure, between three mascles a greyhound's head couped argent. The out-students were under the care of  Marion Kennedy. She bore: Argent, a chevron gules between in chief two crosses botonny fitchy sable and in base a boar's head couped sable langued gules - a coat slightly differing from that of Kennedy of Kirkmichael, Ayrshire, which has crosses crosslet fitchy.

The other great benefactors of the college were Henry Sidgwick and Eleanor Mildred Balfour, who married in 1876. Mrs Sidgwick was Vice-Principal of one of the College's Halls, later becoming Principal of the College in 1892. Their arms were - Sidgwick (assumed arms): Gules, a fess between three griffins' heads erased or; and Balfour (of Balbirnie): Argent, on a chevron engrailed between three mullets sable an otter's head erased argent.

In the college arms the chevron links them with the coats of Balfour and Kennedy, while its colour and the mascles refer to Clough. The crosses come from Kennedy, the mullet from Balfour, and the griffin's head from Sidgwick. No crest was granted, for although a corporate body may have a crest, it was thought that a crest and helm would be inappropriate to one composed entirely of women.

College life

Basil Champneys designed what was popularly said to be "the second-longest continuous indoor corridor in Europe" in order to prevent the women of the college stepping outside in the rain. The laboratory, which can be found near the sports field, now houses a space which hosts a range of cultural events, such as theatre productions, music recitals and art exhibitions.

Alongside a formal hall, there is also a modern buttery in which to eat and relax. The College is also home to the Grade II* listed 1897 Yates Thompson Library and the Horner Markwick building. The library was originally Newnham students' primary reference source since women were not allowed into the University Library. The library was built with a gift from Henry Yates Thompson and his wife, Elizabeth. It remains one of the largest college libraries in Cambridge with a collection of 90,000 volumes, including approximately 6,000 rare books.

The college has two official combination rooms that represent the interests of students in the college and are responsible for social aspects of college life. Undergraduates are members of the Junior Combination Room (JCR), whilst graduate students are members of the Middle Combination Room (MCR).

Newnham has many societies of its own including clubs for rowing, football, netball, tennis, and many other sports, as well as several choirs. As Newnham is a non-denominational foundation, it does not have its own chapel. Choral scholars at Newnham form part of Selwyn College's chapel choir. Newnham College Boat Club, the university's first women's boat club, share a boathouse with Jesus College Boat Club.

Principals
Anne Clough (1871–1892)
Eleanor Mildred Sidgwick (1892–1910)
Katharine Stephen (January 1911 – 1920)
Blanche Athena Clough (1920–1923)
Pernel Strachey (1923–1941)
Myra Curtis (1942–1954)
Ruth Louisa Cohen (1954–1972)
Jean Floud (1973–1982)
Sheila Jeanne Browne (1983–1992) 
Onora O'Neill (1992–2006)
Patricia Hodgson (2006–2012)
Carol M. Black (2012–July 2019)
Alison Rose (October 2019–present)

Alumnae

In literature and film

Newnham College is described in two of Virginia Woolf's works, A Room of One's Own (under the name 'Fernham') and "A Women's College from the Outside".

Newnham College appeared in the 2019 film Red Joan.

ITV's detective series Grantchester set the first episode of the fifth series (2020) in Newnham, in a plot featuring the death of a student after a May Ball.

Gallery

See also
 :Category:Fellows of Newnham College, Cambridge

References

External links

 Newnham College official website
 

 
Colleges of the University of Cambridge
Educational institutions established in 1871
Women's universities and colleges in the United Kingdom
1871 establishments in England